Chlorinated polyvinyl chloride (CPVC) is a thermoplastic produced by chlorination of polyvinyl chloride (PVC) resin. CPVC is significantly more flexible than PVC, and can also withstand higher temperatures. Uses include hot and cold water delivery pipes and industrial liquid handling. CPVC, like PVC, is deemed safe for the transport and use of potable water.

History

Genova Products located in Michigan initially created the first CPVC tubing and fittings for hot- and cold-water distribution systems in the early 1960s. The original tetrahydrofuran (THF) / methyl ethyl ketone (MEK) formulas for CPVC cements were developed by Genova in conjunction with the B.F. Goodrich Company, the original developer of the CPVC resin.

Production process
Chlorinated polyvinyl chloride (CPVC) is PVC that has been chlorinated via a free radical chlorination reaction. This reaction is typically initiated by application of thermal or UV energy utilizing various approaches. In the process, chlorine gas is decomposed into free radical chlorine which is then reacted with PVC in a post-production step, essentially replacing a portion of the hydrogen in the PVC with chlorine.

Depending on the method, a varying amount of chlorine is introduced into the polymer allowing for a measured way to fine-tune the final properties. The chlorine content may vary from manufacturer to manufacturer; the base can be as low as PVC 56.7% to as high as 74% by mass, although most commercial resins have chlorine content from 63% to 69%. As the chlorine content in CPVC is increased, its glass transition temperature (Tg) increases significantly.  Under normal operating conditions, CPVC becomes unstable at 70% mass of chlorine.

Various additives are also introduced into the resin in order to make the material more receptive to processing. These additives may consist of stabilizers, impact modifiers, pigments and lubricants.

Physical properties
CPVC shares most of the features and properties of PVC, but also has some key differences. CPVC is readily workable, including machining, welding, and forming. Because of its excellent corrosion resistance at elevated temperatures, CPVC is ideally suited for self-supporting constructions where temperatures up to 200 °F (93 °C) are present. The ability to bend, shape, and weld CPVC enables its use in a wide variety of processes and applications. It exhibits fire-retardant properties.

Comparison to polyvinyl chloride (PVC)

Heat resistance
CPVC can withstand corrosive water at temperatures greater than PVC, typically greater by 40–50 °C (greater by 72–90 °F), contributing to its popularity as a material for water-piping systems in residential and commercial construction. CPVC maximal operating temperature peaks at 200 °F (93 °C).

Mechanical properties
The principal mechanical difference between CPVC and PVC is that CPVC is significantly more ductile, allowing greater flexure and crush resistance. Additionally, the mechanical strength of CPVC makes it a viable candidate to replace many types of metal pipe in conditions where metal's susceptibility to corrosion limits its use.

{| class="wikitable"
|+ Properties of CPVC and PVC
|-
! rowspan=2 |
! colspan=2 | Schedule 40
! colspan=2 | Schedule 80
|-
! CPVC
! PVC
! CPVC
! PVC
|-
! Max. working pressure
| 
| 
| 
| 
|-
! Tensile strength
| 
| 
| 
| 
|-
! Temperature limits
| 
| 
| 
| 
|}

Additionally, CPVC is a thermoplastic and as such has greater insulation than that of copper pipes. Due to this increased insulation, CPVC experiences less condensation formation and better maintains water temperature for both hot and cold applications.

Bonding 
Due to its specific composition, bonding CPVC requires a specialized solvent cement different from PVC, with high-strength formulas being first introduced in 1965 by Genova Products, followed by alternatives such as IPS's Weld-On line.

Primers, solvent cements, and bonding agents for CPVC reportedly must meet ASTM F493 specifications, differing from PVC solvent cements that must adhere to ASTM D2564 standards.

Fire properties
CPVC is similar to PVC in resistance to fire. It is typically very difficult to ignite and tends to self-extinguish when not in a directly applied flame.

Due to its chlorine content, the incineration of CPVC, either in a fire or in an industrial disposal process, can result in the creation of chlorinated dioxins and the similarly dangerous polychlorinated dibenzofurans, both which bioaccumulate.

References

External links
 PVC4Pipes (Global PVC Pipe trade association)

Vinyl polymers
Plastics